Derry (Doire in Irish)  is a townland in the historical Barony of Ormond Lower, County Tipperary, Ireland. It is located west of Rathcabban in the civil parish of Dorrha in the north of the county.

References

Townlands of County Tipperary